The Grão-Pará Ecological Station ( is a strictly protected ecological station in the state of Pará, Brazil.
It managed by the state of Pará. With  of well-preserved Amazon rainforest it is the largest fully protected tropical forest conservation unit in the world.

Location

The Grão-Pará Ecological Station is on the left bank of the Amazon River in the west of the state of Pará.
It contains parts of the basins of the Maicuru, Curuá, Cuminapanema, Erepecuru, Trombetas and Mapuera rivers.
The unit covers parts of the municipalities of Oriximiná (75.89%), Alenquer (13.31%), Óbidos (7.36%) and Monte Alegre (3.44%).
Its boundaries are:
North: Tumucumaque Mountains National Park and Guyana.
East: Tumucumaque National Park Indian Territory, Rio Paru D'Este Indian Territory and Maicuru Biological Reserve.
South: Trombetas-Mapuera Indian Territory, Trombetas State Forest, Zo'é Indian Territory and  Paru State Forest.
West: State of Roraima.

History

The Grão-Pará Ecological Station was established by state decree 2609 of 4 December 2006, signed by the state governor Simão Jatene.
Others included the  Maicuru Biological Reserve, the Paru, Trombetas, Faro and  Iriri state forests and the Triunfo do Xingu Environmental Protection Area.
Creation of the protected areas was expected to reduce deforestation, mining and consequent mercury contamination of water, poaching, irregular farming and other threats.

Within two months of creation of the strictly protected unit it was reported that the Rio Tinto mining company was seeking approval to have  excluded from the unit. The miner had been prospecting for bauxite near the headwaters of the Curuá River, and thought there might be a huge deposit.
It seemed unlikely that the permission would be given since this would throw into doubt the state's entire environmental plan.

In 2007, the Pará Secretary of State for the Environment signed a Term of Technical Cooperation with the Museu Paraense Emílio Goeldi, Forest Development Institute of Pará, Institute of Man and Environment, Conservation International and the German Technical Cooperation Agency. 
These institutions worked together to develop the management plan for the implementation of the reserve, published in 2011.
The Management Plan is based on the general objectives for a conservation unit, and establishes standards for use of the area and management of natural resources, including implementation of the physical structures needed to manage the unit.

Environment 

The terrain is rugged, with no access roads or fully navigable rivers.
The unit can be reached only by helicopter or light air plane using improvised landing strips.
It is known that indigenous people access it through the Trombetas and Erepecuru river regions.

The Grão-Pará Ecological Station is in the Amazon biome.
It has a tropical monsoon climate.
Even in the driest months rainfall is above .
The unit contains parts of two sub-basins of the Amazon River, the Nhamundá-Trombetas basin and the Cuminapanema-Maicuru sub-basin.

The unit is mostly covered with dense submontane rainforest (89.43%) or transitional forest (8.9%), with small areas of cerrado (0.79%) and dense alluvial rainforest (0.01%).
Known numbers of species include 125 fish, 62 amphibians, 68 reptiles, 355 birds, 61 mammals, 125 ferns and 653 flowering plants.
The natural resources are well preserved.

Conservation

The Grão-Pará Ecological Station allows only indirect use of its natural resources, and has the specific purpose of conserving nature and supporting scientific research. 
Public visits are prohibited except for educational purposes subject to the Management Plan, and scientific research requires prior permission of SEMA/PA.
It lies entirely within the Pará Northern Corridor Full Protection Zone (Zona de Proteção Integral da Calha Norte Paraense).
With the other protected areas and indigenous lands in the region it connects the Central Amazon Ecological Corridor to the west with the Amapá corridor to the east.
The conservation unit is supported by the Amazon Region Protected Areas Program.

Notes

Sources

2006 establishments in Brazil
Protected areas of Pará
Ecological stations of Brazil
Protected areas established in 2006